Ifatsy is a town and commune in Madagascar. It belongs to the district of Vohipeno, which is a part of Vatovavy-Fitovinany Region. The population of the commune was estimated to be approximately 15,000 in 2001 commune census.

Primary and junior level secondary education are available in town. The majority 93% of the population of the commune are farmers, while an additional 5% receives their livelihood from raising livestock. The most important crops are coffee and oranges, while other important agricultural products are cassava and rice. Services provide employment for 2% of the population.

References and notes 

Populated places in Vatovavy-Fitovinany